Jack Zwirewich (11 February 1929 – 15 September 1989) was a Canadian rower. He competed at the 1948 Summer Olympics and the 1952 Summer Olympics.

References

External links

1929 births
1989 deaths
Canadian male rowers
Olympic rowers of Canada
Rowers at the 1948 Summer Olympics
Rowers at the 1952 Summer Olympics
Place of birth missing